Doug Alker (born 1940) is the former chair of the British Deaf Association and the Royal National Institute for the Deaf. His self-published 2000 book, Really Not Interested in the Deaf?, is a criticism of the Royal National Institute for the Deaf (RNID) and the story of his departure from the group.

After he left RNID he set up the political pressure group Federation of Deaf People (FDP) in 1997. As the chair, he and the FDP are primarily responsible for pressuring the UK government into officially recognizing British Sign Language. On 18 March 2003 the UK government formally recognized that BSL is a language in its own right.

He previously worked as a researcher for the BBC television programme See Hear.

Publications

References

External links
 British Sign Language Broadcasting Trust interview with Doug Alker

1950 births
British male writers
British non-fiction writers
Deaf activists
Deaf writers
Living people
English deaf people
BSL users
Male non-fiction writers